Major General Johan Pelser (born 17 August 1957) is a South African Air Force officer, currently serving as Chief Director Force Development and Support.

Military service
Pelser joined the Air Force in 1982.

Education
Pelser obtained a Masters of Engineering degree from the University of Pretoria in 1997.

References

1957 births
Living people
South African Air Force generals